Gakushū juku are Japanese private cram schools.

Juku may also refer to:
Juku E5101 a personal computer based on a Soviet clone of the Intel i8080A produced in Estonia in 1980s-1990s
, Estonian training ship
Juku, an Estonian diminutive of the names Juhan or Johannes, commonly takes place of "Little Johnny" in Estonian jokes